Angels Die Hard is a 1970 biker film directed by Richard Compton and starring Tom Baker and William Smith. It is the first film distributed by New World Pictures; half its budget was provided by Roger Corman.

The film—which was written in three months—revolves around a gang of bikers who try to save people from a mining accident. Compton shot the film on location in Kernville, California, on the shore of Lake Isabella, an old gold-mining town that was used for filming early Hollywood Westerns.

Cast
Tom Baker as Blair
William Smith as Tim
Carl Steppling as Sheriff
Alan DeWitt as Undertaker
Gary Littlejohn as Piston
Beach Dickerson as Shank
Rita Murray as Naomi
R. G. Armstrong as Mel
Connie Nelson as Nancy
Dan Haggerty as Bearded Biker

References

External links

American exploitation films
American action films
1970s English-language films
1970 action films
1970 films
New World Pictures films
Outlaw biker films
Films directed by Richard Compton
1970s American films